The Rural Municipality of Frenchman Butte No. 501 is a rural municipality (RM) in the Canadian province of Saskatchewan within Census Division No. 17 and  Division No. 6.

History 
The RM of Frenchman Butte No. 501 incorporated as a rural municipality on January 1, 1954. It was formed through the amalgamation of the RMs of Paradise Hill No. 501 and North Star No. 531 on December 31, 1953.

Geography

Communities and localities 
The following urban municipalities are surrounded by the RM.

Towns
St. Walburg

Villages
Paradise Hill

The following unincorporated communities are within the RM.

Organized hamlets
Frenchman Butte

Localities
Fort Pitt
Harlan
Onion Lake

The RM also surrounds Seekaskootch First Nation Indian Reserve No. 119 and borders Makaoo 120.

Demographics 

Government 
The RM of Frenchman Butte No. 501 is governed by an elected municipal council and an appointed administrator that meets on the second Thursday of every month. The reeve of the RM is Barbara Bonnie Mills-Midgley while its administrator is Mae Rotsey. The RM's office is located in Paradise Hill.

Transportation 
Rail
North Battleford - Turtleford Branch  C.N.R—serves North Battleford, Hamlin, Prince, Meota, Vawn, Edam, Longstaff, Mervin, Turtleford, Cleeves, Spruce Lake, St. Walburg

Roads
Highway 797—serves Fort Pitt and Onion Lake and Frenchman Butte
Highway 21 --
Highway 26—intersects Highway 3
Highway 795 --
Highway 3—serves Paradise Hill

See also 
List of rural municipalities in Saskatchewan

References 

F

Division No. 17, Saskatchewan